Šingaliai (formerly) is a village in Kėdainiai district municipality, in Kaunas County, in central Lithuania. According to the 2011 census, the village had a population of 12 people. There are old cemetery, large greenhouse farm and canning factory in Šingaliai.

Demography

Images

References

Villages in Kaunas County
Kėdainiai District Municipality